Sandborn, Indiana is a geographic place;
Peter Sandborn, American engineer